Weights & Measures is the debut album by the American pop rock band, Hyland.  Weights & Measures is the first album released on Hyland's new label, Tooth & Nail Records. It was released on May 3, 2011.  "This Love Is Free" peaked at No. 29 on the Christian Songs chart published by Billboard.

Name meaning

Lead vocalist Jon Lewis explains:

Track listing

Music videos
"The One that Got Away" (no appearance by Stephen Christian)
"This Love Is Free"

Personnel

Jon Lewis - lead vocals, rhythm guitar
Mitch Hansen - lead guitar
Ben Early - keys, backing vocals, additional guitar
Jaran Sorenson - bass
Steve Weigel - drums
Ben Kasica - guitar solo ("Til Death")

References

2011 debut albums
Hyland (band) albums